María Elena Carrera Villavicencio (born 2 January 1929) is a Chilean physician and politician who served as a member of the Senate of Chile.

References

External links
 BCN Profile

1929 births
Living people
People from Santiago
Carrera family
Chilean people of Basque descent
Socialist Party of Chile politicians
Senators of the XLV Legislative Period of the National Congress of Chile
Senators of the XLVI Legislative Period of the National Congress of Chile
Senators of the XLVII Legislative Period of the National Congress of Chile
Senators of the XLVIII Legislative Period of the National Congress of Chile
Senators of the XLIX Legislative Period of the National Congress of Chile
University of Concepción alumni
University of Chile alumni